The 2015 Indianapolis motorcycle Grand Prix was the tenth round of the 2015 Grand Prix motorcycle racing season. It was held at the Indianapolis Motor Speedway in Speedway, Indiana on 9 August 2015.

In the MotoGP category, Marc Márquez took his fifth pole position of the season and ultimately took his third win of the season — and his fifth consecutive win at Indianapolis Motor Speedway. Márquez's victory was also the 700th victory in the Grand Prix history for the Honda brand. Behind Márquez were the two Movistar Yamaha riders, Jorge Lorenzo, and Valentino Rossi; the podium was swept by these riders in the previous year. Further down the order, Ducati's Andrea Dovizioso started from tenth on the grid, but he went off track on the first lap. After he fell to the rear of the field, Dovizioso was able to finish ninth, just behind Cal Crutchlow. Forward Racing did not compete this event following the arrest of team boss Giovanni Cuzari. Stefan Bradl, who was joining Gresini Racing, finished in twentieth place. Toni Elías, who replaced Karel Abraham as Abraham recovered from injuries sustained at the Catalan Grand Prix, finished in twenty-second. Jack Miller crashed out of the race with twenty laps remaining.

Classification

MotoGP

Moto2

Moto3

Championship standings after the race (MotoGP)
Below are the standings for the top seven riders and constructors after round ten has concluded.

Riders' Championship standings

Constructors' Championship standings

Teams' Championship standings

 Note: Only the top seven positions are included for both sets of standings.

References

Indianapolis
Indianapolis motorcycle Grand Prix
Indianapolis motorcycle Grand Prix
Indy
Indianapolis motorcycle Grand Prix